Jimmy Maxwell (born August 30, 1953) is a musician and band leader who has performed and conducted from coast to coast in the United States. Jimmy has been the band for top social functions in New Orleans since 1981. From 1985 to 1989, Jimmy was partners with Peter Duchin, the famed society band leader from New York City and together they produced events involving sound, lighting, staging and even decor.

Early life and education
Maxwell was born in New Orleans, son of Edward Maxwell, who played drums with the Rene Louapre Society Orchestra  from 1950 up until joining Jimmy in 1981. His mother was a professional singer.  Maxwell was taken as a youngster to hear many jazz, pop and classical artists at local clubs and concert halls.

He began by studying drums and percussion at the age of 8 in the school band. By the age 12, Maxwell was studying piano with Guy Bernard, a music professor at Loyola University New Orleans. Later in his teenage years he was "band boy" for Rene' Louapre's Society Orchestra and would set the music stands, lights, and arrangements for the orchestra on a nightly basis. As well as acting as bartender for the band, he occasionally subbed on drums or piano to relieve fellow musicians.

Career
By his late 20s, Maxwell had learned the business side of the music business and was leading his own band. From 1985 to 1989 he was partners with Peter Duchin, a society band leader from New York City; together they produced events involving sound, lighting, staging and decor. He appeared at the 1988 Republican National Convention, and was pictured on the front page of the New York Times with Nancy and Ronald Reagan. President George H. W. Bush later invited him to play for the first anniversary inaugural ball at the Kennedy Center with Harry Connick Jr., Tony Bennett, and Chubby Checker.

Maxwell incorporates elements of New Orleans jazz in his orchestra, but also includes other styles, including R&B, "stride piano", New Orleans funk and the essence of the New Orleans groove. The band's repertoire includes popular dance music from the 1900s into the 21st century.

He has performed with or for Rita Moreno, Joel Grey, The 5th Dimension, The Neville Brothers, Harry Connick Sr., Hanson, Peter Duchin, Rich Little, Lou Rawls, Reba McEntire, Al Hirt, The Drifters, Pete Fountain, Diane Schuur, The Vienna Boys' Choir, Alex Donner, Presidents Ronald Reagan, George H. W. Bush, and Bill Clinton, members of Great Britain’s Royal Family (Prince & Princess Michael of York; Princess Margaret, and Prince Andrew), Bill Gates, Major Ronald Ferguson, Henry Kissinger, Colin Powell, former Supreme Court Justice Sandra Day O'Connor, Anne Rice, two-time Heavyweight Boxing Champion George Foreman and the Chicago Bulls.

References

External links
 Official website

American bandleaders
1953 births
Living people